Mnouchkine may refer to:

 Alexandre Mnouchkine (1908–1993), French film producer
 Ariane Mnouchkine (born 1939), French stage director